Labordia helleri, the Nā Pali coast labordia or Heller's labordia, is a rare species of flowering plant in the Loganiaceae family. It is endemic to Hawaii, where it is found only on Kauai. It is a federally listed endangered species of the United States. Like other Labordia species, this plant is known as Kamakahala.

This species was once found throughout Kauai, but today there are only 10 populations totalling no more than 550 plants. Most are within the Nā Pali Kona Forest Reserve and Kuia Natural Area Reserve.

This is a shrub growing up to 4.5 meters tall. It may have climbing stems. The inflorescence is a cyme of 3 to 9 white or greenish yellow flowers.

This plant is threatened by feral ungulates, such as wild boars, which damage habitat by causing erosion. The habitat is also experiencing the introduction of invasive species of plants.

References

helleri
Endemic flora of Hawaii
Biota of Kauai